Southern Boone High School is a public secondary school in Ashland, Missouri. It is operated by the Southern Boone County R-1 School District and serves much of southern Boone County, Missouri. It borders the Columbia Public Schools District to the north.

In 2022, Southern Boone won the Missouri state class 4 high school baseball championship.

References

External links
Official site

Ashland, Missouri
Public high schools in Missouri
High schools in Boone County, Missouri